Meidling Hauptstraße  is a station on  of the Vienna U-Bahn. It is located in the Meidling District. It opened in 1980.

References

Buildings and structures in Meidling
Railway stations opened in 1980
Vienna U-Bahn stations
1980 establishments in Austria
Railway stations in Austria opened in the 20th century